Quirino may refer to:

People
Quirino Armellini (1889–1975), Italian military officer 
Quirino Cristiani (1896–1984),  Italian-born Argentine animation director and cartoonist
Quirino Majorana (1871–1957), Italian experimental physicist
Quirino Paulino Castillo, a Dominican on trial in New York on drug charges 
Elpidio Quirino (1890-1956), former President of the Philippines
Andre Bambú Quirino (born 1979), Brazilian basketball player
Carlos Quirino (1910–1999), Filipino historian
Cory Quirino (born 1953), Filipino television host, author and beauty pageant titleholder
Claudinei Quirino da Silva (born 1970), Brazilian sprinter
Thiago Quirino da Silva (born 1985), Brazilian football player

Places

Philippines
Cities and Municipalities
Quirino, a province in the Philippines
Quirino, Ilocos Sur
Quirino, Isabela
President Quirino, Sultan Kudarat

Structures
Quirino Airport
Quirino State College
Quirino LRT Station, in Manila
Quirino MRT Station, a proposed station in Quezon City

Italy
San Quirino, a commune in Pordenone
Teatro Quirino, an opera house in Rome

Roads
Quirino Highway (Quezon City), a beltway from Quezon City to the province of Bulacan
Quirino Avenue, a highway in central Manila
Elpidio Quirino Avenue, a major road in southern Manila

Italian masculine given names